Preston is a provincial electoral district in Nova Scotia, Canada which existed from 1993 to 2013 and since 2021.  It elected one member of the Nova Scotia House of Assembly.  The electoral district included the black communities of North Preston, East Preston, and Cherry Brook. It also includes the communities of Lake Loon, Lake Echo, Mineville, Montague Gold Mines, Westphal, Lawrencetown and part of Dartmouth.

The electoral district was created in 1993 and was conceived to provide representation to the area's rural black community; roughly two-thirds of the population during the district's existence was African Nova Scotian. It was the first riding in all of Nova Scotia to feature an entirely African Nova Scotian slate of candidates in the 2021 provincial election. The electoral district was abolished following the 2012 electoral boundary review and was largely replaced by the new electoral district of Preston-Dartmouth. The riding was re-created following the 2019 boundary review, mostly out of Preston-Dartmouth, but also out of parts of Waverley-Fall River-Beaver Bank, Cole Harbour-Portland Valley, Eastern Shore and a small part of Colchester-Musquodoboit Valley.

Geography

Members of the Legislative Assembly
The electoral district was represented by the following Members of the Legislative Assembly:

Election results

1993 general election

1998 general election

1999 general election

2003 general election

2006 general election

2009 general election

2021 general election

References

Former provincial electoral districts of Nova Scotia
Politics of Halifax, Nova Scotia